Bedriye Hoşgör (1889 Ottoman Empire – 1968, Turkey) was a Turkish composer.

Hoşgör was influenced by the tekke music tradition as a child growing up in Konya. After she and her family moved to Istanbul, Hoşgör took oud lessons from Enderunlu İsmet Efendi and Udi Afet and usul lessons from Halit Bey, a muezzin at the palace. Hoşgör also worked with Tanburi Cemil Bey whom she had met at a social gathering. Cemil Bey encouraged Hoşgör to enroll in the “Darülbedayî-i Musik-î Osmanî” school where she greatly expanded her knowledge of music. Hoşgör also worked with Udi Nevres Bey.

See also 
 List of composers of classical Turkish music

References

Composers of Ottoman classical music
Composers of Turkish makam music
1889 births
1968 deaths